Atandwa Kani (born 6 June 1984) is a South African actor. He is the son of actor John Kani.

Early life
Kani was born on 6 June 1984 in Port Elizabeth, Eastern Cape. He was exposed to the entertainment industry at a young age by observing and learning from his father, who studied scripts for his own acting roles and took his son to theatre performances. These experiences influenced him to follow in his father's footsteps. He was educated at the University of Witwatersrand (Wits), where he studied theatre performance and participated in school productions. He graduated in 2008, with an Honours degree in theatrical performance. In 2019, Kani was completing a MFA in Acting at New York University's Tisch School of the Arts.

Career
Kani made his international stage debut in The Tempest, a collaboration between the Baxter Theatre Centre and the Royal Shakespeare Company, where he played Ariel alongside his father (Caliban) and Sir Antony Sher (Prospero). One reviewer described him as "the star of this production...he was a true pleasure to watch, embodying the character and interacting beautifully with the rest of the cast". Sean Hewitt of the Nottingham news site, Nottingham Post, wrote "....scene-stealing Atandwa Kani, the best Ariel I've ever seen".

In 2009, Kani made his United States television debut in the CW Television Network program Life Is Wild, an American adaptation of the hugely popular ITV family drama Wild at Heart that aired in the United Kingdom from 2006 until 2012. The American adaptation was commissioned for only one season, but from 2010 to 2012, Kani played the role of Thabo in series 5 and 6, plus a brief appearance in series 7, of the original British Wild at Heart, starring Stephen Tompkinson and Dawn Steele.

In 2009, Kani performed in two new plays, Hayani and ID Pending, which explore ideas of home and identity for young South Africans in different ways. Together with fellow actor and Wits graduate Nat Ramabulana, and directed by Warren Nebe, they premiered the productions at the Grahamstown National Arts Festival.

Kani has been featured in the TrueLove magazine in the first of its In Bed With... features. In 2010, he was a regular in the SABC TV series Soul Buddyz. In 2011, he became a regular on the SABC 2 political series, 90 Plein Street in its third season, directed by Khalo Matabane. He also served as Master of Ceremonies for the 46664 "Legacy" Bangle, alongside Tokyo Sexwale and Hlubi Mboya.

He then went on to play the young Nelson Mandela in the movie Mandela: Long Walk to Freedom, directed by Justin Chadwick, acting alongside Idris Elba, Naomie Harris and Terry Pheto.

Kani went on to appear as the lead on Kowethu, a SABC 1 drama directed by Rolie Nikiwe. After which he was seen in the international BET series The Book of Negroes alongside Cuba Gooding Jr.

In 2014, Kani joined the acclaimed group Fortune Cookie Theatre Company and, alongside Sylvaine Strike, went on to perform Black & Blue at the Market Theatre. He also performed Sizwe Banzi Is Dead in New York City, directed by Dr. John Kani. They are currently preparing for a South African tour of this production.

Kani has recently been seen in the hit Mzansi Magic TV series, It's Complicated.

On Tuesday, 12 July 2016, Kani attended the African premiere of The Suit, a short film in which he plays the role of Philemon, at the Old Fort of Zanzibar as part of the 19th Zanzibar International Film Festival. The film was written and directed by South African filmmaker Jarryd Coetsee and based on the short story by Can Themba. Though the film was not a part of the official competition, it was given a Special Mention by the jury.

In 2018, Kani portrayed the younger King T'Chaka, a dual part shared with his father, John Kani, in the film Black Panther.

Personal life
He was married to presenter Thembisa Mdoda from 2012 – 2015 and is married to Fikile Mthwalo as of 2015.

Filmography

Television

Film

References

External links

Living people
People from Port Elizabeth
Xhosa people
South African male stage actors
South African male television actors
1984 births
Tisch School of the Arts alumni